Tetiana Prudnikova (born 29 March 1954) is a Russian former swimmer. She competed in two events at the 1972 Summer Olympics for the Soviet Union.

References

1954 births
Living people
Russian female swimmers
Olympic swimmers of the Soviet Union
Swimmers at the 1972 Summer Olympics
Place of birth missing (living people)
Soviet female swimmers